Keijo Parkkinen (born 28 October 1965) is a Finnish orienteering competitor, four times medalist in the relay at the World Orienteering Championships.

He received a bronze medal in the relay event in 1989, a bronze medal in 1991, a bronze medal in 1993, and a silver medal in 1995. The silver team in 1995 consisted of Parkkinen, Reijo Mattinen, Timo Karppinen, and Janne Salmi.

See also
 Finnish orienteers
 List of orienteers
 List of orienteering events

References

1965 births
Living people
Finnish orienteers
Male orienteers
Foot orienteers
World Orienteering Championships medalists